The following Union Army units and commanders fought in the Battle of Wilson's Creek of the American Civil War, fought on August 10, 1861, near Springfield, Missouri.  The Confederate order of battle is shown separately.

Abbreviations used

Military rank
 BG = Brigadier General
 Col = Colonel
 Ltc = Lieutenant Colonel
 Maj = Major
 Cpt = Captain
 Lt = Lieutenant
 2Lt = 2nd Lieutenant

Other
 w = wounded
 k = killed

Army of the West
BG Nathaniel Lyon (k)
 Maj Samuel D. Sturgis

Staff
Asst. Inspector General: BG Thomas W. Sweeny
 Chief of Staff: Maj. John M. Schofield

Notes

References
NPS Order of Battle

Further reading
 Brooksher, William Riley. Bloody Hill: The Civil War Battle of Wilson’s Creek. Washington: Brassey's, 1995.

American Civil War orders of battle